The 1964 Cotton Bowl Classic was the 28th edition of the college football bowl game, played at the Cotton Bowl in Dallas, Texas, on Wednesday, January 1. Part of the 1963–64 bowl game season, the game was a de facto national championship game; the top-ranked and undefeated Texas Longhorns, champions of the Southwest Conference, defeated the #2 Navy Midshipmen, 28–6.

In this era, the final major polls (AP, UPI) were published prior to the bowl games, so Texas would retain those national championships, regardless of the outcome.

Teams

The game was played less than six weeks after the assassination of President Kennedy, a U.S. Navy veteran and avid football fan, in the same city. It was the second #1 versus #2 bowl game, after the previous season's Rose Bowl.

Texas

Texas had won all ten games in the regular season, took the Southwest Conference title, and was first in the polls. This was their third consecutive Cotton Bowl.

Navy

Independent Navy was second in the polls, and featured junior quarterback Roger Staubach, the 1963 Heisman Trophy winner. Their only setback was a four-point loss at SMU (in the Cotton Bowl) in mid-October. Texas won at SMU, 17-12, three weeks later.

Game summary
The Cotton Bowl kicked off at 1 pm CST, as did the Sugar and Orange Bowls.

Two touchdown catches by Phil Harris from Duke Carlisle and a Carlisle touchdown run gave the Longhorns a 21–0 lead at halftime. Another touchdown run by fullback Harold Philipp increased the lead to 28–0 after three quarters. The Midshipmen finally scored on a two-yard touchdown run by Staubach (who went 22 for 34 for 228 yards), which ended the scoring at 28–6.

While the two teams had near even passing yards and near even first downs (18-16), Navy had 29 rushes go for -14 yards while Texas' 43 rushes for 168 yards led to two touchdowns as the Longhorns clinched an undisputed national championship, their first ever. Several Cotton Bowl records were set.

Statistics
{| class=wikitable style="text-align:center"
! Statistics !! Navy  !! Texas
|-
| First Downs || 16|| 18
|-
| Yards Rushing|| -14|| 168
|-
| Yards Passing ||227|| 234
|-
| Passing (C-A-I) ||22–34–1||8–21–1 
|-
|Punts-Average ||6–36.5|| 3–43.3
|-
|Fumbles lost ||2|| 1
|-
|Penalized yards ||35||72
|}

Aftermath
The next major bowl for Texas was the following year in the Orange Bowl, the first played at night, and another win. The next Cotton Bowl for the Longhorns was five years later in January 1969, the first of six consecutive appearances.

Navy had previously played in each of the four major bowls once; this remains their most recent major bowl and their next bowl appearance was in 1978.

References

Cotton Bowl Classic
Cotton Bowl Classic
Navy Midshipmen football bowl games
Texas Longhorns football bowl games
January 1964 sports events in the United States
Cotton Bowl